Budding is a surname. Notable people with the surname include:

Edwin Beard Budding (1795–1846), English inventor
Martijn Budding (born 1995), Dutch cyclist
Richard Budding (born 1957), Dutch footballer